Uptown Theatre was a 1,818-seat theatre located in Milwaukee, Wisconsin. It was built by the Chicago architectural firm Rapp and Rapp and opened in 1926 or 1927. The theatre closed in 1980 and was demolished in 2001.

References

Theatres in Milwaukee
Buildings and structures demolished in 2001
1920s establishments in Wisconsin
Demolished buildings and structures in Wisconsin